Daniel McKenzie may refer to:

 A. Daniel McKenzie (1924–1989), Manitoba, Canada politician
 Daniel McKenzie (footballer) (born 1996), Australian rules footballer
 Daniel McKenzie (racing driver) (born 1988), British racing driver
 Dan McKenzie (geophysicist) (born 1942), British geophysical academic who pioneered plate tectonics
 Daniel Duncan McKenzie (1859–1927), Nova Scotia, Canada politician
 Daniel George McKenzie (1860–1940), farmer and political figure in Nova Scotia, Canada